The Kohat mine is one of the largest gypsum mines in Pakistan. The mine is located in Khyber Pakhtunkhwa. The mine has reserves amounting to 4.91 billion tonnes of gypsum.

See also 
 List of mines in Pakistan

References 

Mines in Pakistan
Gypsum mines in Pakistan